The Gambia, officially the Republic of the Gambia, is a country in West Africa. It is surrounded by Senegal, apart from a short strip of Atlantic coastline at its western end. It is the smallest country on mainland Africa. The Gambia has a liberal, market-based economy characterised by traditional subsistence agriculture, a historic reliance on groundnuts (peanuts) for export earnings, a re-export trade built up around its ocean port, low import duties, minimal administrative procedures, a fluctuating exchange rate with no exchange controls, and a significant tourism industry.

Companies based in The Gambia
 Central Bank of The Gambia
 Bank of British West Africa
 Gambia Postal Services Corporation
 Gambia Radio & Television Service
 Gamtel
 Trust Bank Limited (Gambia)
 SuGam Company Limited (Gambia)

By type

Airlines

Banks

See also
 Economy of the Gambia

References

Companies of the Gambia